Henry "Harry" Archer (26 November 1932 – 24 June 2019), also known by the nickname of "The Architect", was an English rugby union and professional rugby league footballer who played in the 1950s and 1960s, and coached rugby league in the 1980s.

Early life
Archer was born in Dearham, Cumberland, England. His birth was registered in Cockermouth district, Cumberland. He undertook his national service in the RAF Flying Training Command. He owned a Grocery Store om  Main Road in Seaton.

Rugby union playing career

County Cup Final appearances
Archer played in Workington RFC's 1952–53 Cumberland Cup Final.

Rugby league playing career

International honours
Archer represented Great Britain (RL) while at Workington in non-Test matches on the 1958 tour of Australia, and New Zealand.

Four Workington players were selected for the 1958 tour; Harry Archer, Brian Edgar, Ike Southward and Bill Wookey (later of Barrow).

County honours
Archer made his début, and scored a try for Cumberland against Lancashire at Derwent Park, Workington during the 1955–56 season, and he played in Cumberland's victories in the County Championship during the 1961–62 season, 1963–64 season, 1965–66 season and 1966–67 season.

Challenge Cup Final appearances
Archer played  in Workington Town's 9–13 defeat by Wigan in the 1958 Challenge Cup Final during the 1957–58 season at Wembley Stadium, London on Saturday 10 May 1958. He was concussed within the first ten-minutes of the match by a stiff-arm tackle by Mick Sullivan, and had to leave the playing field, and although he returned to the match, he could not remember anything about the rest of the match.

Championship final appearances
Archer played in Workington Town's 3–20 defeat by Hull F.C. in the Championship Final during the 1957–58 season at Odsal Stadium, Bradford on Saturday 17 May 1958.

Western Division Championship Final appearances
Archer played  in Workington Town's 9–9 draw with Widnes in the Western Division Championship Final during the 1962–63 season at Central Park, Wigan on Saturday 10 November 1962, in front of a crowd of 13,588, and he played  in the 10–0 victory over Widnes in the Western Division Championship Final replay during the 1962–63 season on Wednesday 21 November 1962.

Club career
Archer signed for Workington Town on 30 March 1953, the half-back paring of Harry Archer and Sol Roper was initially made in the 29–15 victory over Dewsbury at Crown Flatt, Dewsbury on Saturday 24 September 1955, the following week they played together against New Zealand, the pairing lasted for more than a 10-years and over 300 matches, although not prolific try-scorers, they created hundreds of try-scoring opportunities for, e.g. Ray Glastonbury, Piet Pretorius and Ike Southward, Archer played his last match for Workington Town against Huddersfield on Saturday 19 November 1966, he was transferred from Workington Town to Whitehaven, he made seven appearances for Whitehaven before retiring.

Rugby league coaching career

Club career
Archer coached (jointly with Bill Smith) Workington Town to promotion from the Second Division during the 1983–84 season.

Honoured at Workington Town
Archer is a Workington Town Hall Of Fame Inductee.

Genealogical information
Archer was the son of Robert P. Archer, the rugby league half-back who played in the 1940s for England (Amateurs, now British Amateur Rugby League Association), Dearham ARLFC and Workington Town.

References

External links
Search for "Archer" at rugbyleagueproject.org
(archived by web.archive.org) » Legends Evening 60's
(archived by web.archive.org) Rugby legend Geoff Robinson dies at 77
Workington Town tribute following death of legendary half-back Harry Archer
Harry Archer at totalrl.com → forums

1932 births
2019 deaths
20th-century Royal Air Force personnel
Cumberland rugby league team players
English rugby league coaches
English rugby league players
English rugby union players
Rugby league five-eighths
Rugby league players from Dearham
Rugby union players from Dearham
Workington Town coaches
Workington Town players
Whitehaven R.L.F.C. players